The Tsavo sunbird (Cinnyris tsavoensis) is a small passerine bird of Kenya and Tanzania.  It is sometimes lumped with the purple-banded sunbird.

Range and habitat
It is found in the Tsavo region of southeastern Kenya and nearby northern Tanzania, but not on the coast.  It lives in arid scrub with Commiphora and Acacia trees and shrubs.

Description
The Tsavo sunbird is 9.5 to 10 cm (3.75 to 4 inches) long.  The bill is down-curved and rather short for a sunbird, especially compared to that of the otherwise similar Marico sunbird.

The female is greyish-brown above and on the head with a white eyebrow stripe; the throat is either white or dusky with white edges (malar strips).  The underparts are faintly yellow-tinged white with dusky stripes on the breast.  The tail is bluish-black with grey edges and tip.

The juvenile male looks like the dark-throated form of the female.  Later it develops a black throat and black wing coverts, both with green feathers intermixed, and often a wide black stripe down the belly.

The adult male is apparently the same at all seasons: gleaming bluish-green above and on the head, with a black belly and lower breast.  The upper breast may have a maroon band, missing the center or complete and 3 to 5 mm wide.  (The male purple-banded sunbird has a wider maroon band and a distinct non-breeding plumage.)

The song is "a rapid sputtering tsustiseesee, chuchiti-tsi-tsi-tsi-tsi sitisee-see-see-see chitisee…" and variants, sometimes only the last few notes.  Calls resemble the purple-banded sunbird's: "[l]oud annoyance chatter, chi-chi-chi-chi…" and "a high tsik-tsiki-tsik or brrrzi."

Classification
Some authorities consider it a subspecies of the purple-banded sunbird.  Here it is considered a separate species following the Handbook of the Birds of the World and other authorities.

References

Tsavo sunbird
Birds of East Africa
Tsavo sunbird